Women's Aid Federation of England, commonly called Women's Aid within England, is one of a group of charities across the United Kingdom. There are four main Women's Aid Federations, one for each of the countries of the United Kingdom. Its aim is to end domestic violence against women and children. The charity works at both local and national levels to ensure women's safety from domestic violence and promotes policies and practices to prevent domestic violence.

Women's Aid Federation of England is the sole national co-ordinating body for the England-wide network of over 370 local domestic violence organisations, providing over 500 refuges, outreach, advocacy and children's support services. Women's Aid campaigns for better legal protection and services and in partnership with its national network, runs public awareness and education campaigns.  Any woman can stay at a refuge (and take their children) and proof of abuse is not needed to stay at a refuge.

Women's Aid provides services through its publications and website, and runs a Freephone 24-Hour National Domestic Violence Helpline in partnership with Refuge.

History

Origins

Women's Aid was set up as a national United Kingdom federation to co-ordinate almost 40 services that had been established over the country. It was originally known as the National Women's Aid Federation, before the launch of Scottish Women's Aid in 1976, and both Welsh Women's Aid and the Women's Aid Federation Northern Ireland in 1978. The first Women's Aid federation was set up in 1974, shortly after the founding of the first refuge for women experiencing domestic violence. The organisation provided practical and emotional support as part of a range of services to women and children experiencing violence. The charity was instrumental in lobbying for the 1976 Domestic Violence and Matrimonial Proceedings Act, and for having women and children at risk of domestic violence to count as homeless under the 1977 Housing Act.

During the 1980s, Women's Aid established the first ever National Domestic Violence Helpline service to meet the increasing number of calls to Women's Aid national office. The Helpline not only provided help and support for abused women and children, as well as agency professionals seeking advice, it also became a national referral point for access to the national network of refuge and support services. The charity continued to lobby for greater consideration and support for women and children experiencing domestic violence.

Through the 1990s, Women's Aid continued its lobbying work, as well as increasing its public campaigning. In 1994, the charity released the first ever domestic violence cinema advert, and supported the television soap opera Brookside in a long-running, high-profile storyline on a family affected by domestic violence. In 1999, Women's Aid launched the first comprehensive domestic violence website in the UK and The Gold Book, the first ever UK-wide public directory of local refuge and helpline services.

Since 2000, Women's Aid has run a number of high-profile campaigns, continued its work lobbying government, and launched a number of educational resources aimed at schools and teachers to encourage the teaching of healthy relationships as a preventative measure against domestic violence. Katie Ghose was the CEO of Women's Aid, having started in July 2017. She took over the post from Polly Neate, and stepped down in February 2019, after complaints from a number of women groups after her public praise of UKIP.

Research
In 1978, Women's Aid carried out a study of 1,000 women living in refuges, in light of statistics demonstrating that 1 in 4 crimes in Scotland was 'wife assault.' This was the beginning of significant amounts of research performed by Women's Aid and a number of partners into issues around domestic violence, which has developed into the release of Women's Aid's 'Annual Survey of Members', which gives details of the services in England working to support women experiencing domestic violence, and the women who use them.

Activities
Women's Aid states that:

Domestic violence against women is a violation of women and children's human rights, that it is the result of an abuse of power and control, and that it is rooted in the historical status of women in the family and in society. Women and children have a right to live their lives free from all forms of violence and abuse, and society has a duty to recognise and defend this right.

Women's Aid advocate for abused women and children in three main ways. Firstly, they aim to affect policy decisions and laws by working with local and national government. Secondly, they attempt to raise awareness of the problem of domestic violence by campaigning and running websites such as The Hideout. Thirdly, they provide services to abused women and children, for example UKROL and the National Domestic Violence Helpline.

Supporters
 Jenni Murray, broadcaster
 Will Young, performer
 Nicola Harwin CBE, Former Women's Aid Chief Executive
 Gordon Ramsay, three Michelin star chef
 Sarah Brown, wife of Gordon Brown, former UK Prime Minister
 Fiona Bruce, BBC newsreader
 Charlie Webster, TV presenter
 Keira Knightley, actress
 Jahméne Douglas, British soul/gospel singer, and the first youth ambassador of the UK charity Women's Aid, for children and young people
 Jess Phillips, British member of parliament and former employee
 Mel B, singer
 Toby-Alexander Smith, actor

See also

 Scottish Women's Aid
 ManKind Initiative
 Cut (advertisement)
 What's it going to take?

References

External links
 Women's Aid website
 Scottish Women's Aid
 Welsh Women's Aid
 Northern Ireland Women's Aid Federation
 Jewish Women's Aid
 Men's Advice Line

Feminist organisations in England
Family and parenting issues groups in the United Kingdom
Charities based in Bristol
1971 establishments in England
Organizations established in 1971
Child abuse-related organizations
Domestic violence-related organizations